The Fletcher, later Aubrey-Fletcher Baronetcy, of Clea Hall in the County of Cumberland, is a title in the Baronetage of Great Britain. It was created on 20 May 1782 for Henry Fletcher, a Director of the Honourable East India Company and Member of Parliament. He was a descendant of Philip Fletcher (17th century), whose brother Sir Richard Fletcher was the father of Sir Henry Fletcher, 1st Baronet, of Hutton in le Forest (see Fletcher baronets for more information on this branch of the family). Fletcher was succeeded by his son, Henry, the second Baronet. He was High Sheriff of Cumberland from 1810 to 1811. His grandson, the fourth Baronet, was a prominent Conservative politician. In 1903 he assumed by Royal licence the additional surname of Aubrey on inheriting the Aubrey estates on the death of Charles Aubrey. Aubrey-Fletcher died childless and was succeeded by his younger brother, Lancelot, the fifth Baronet. He assumed by Royal licence the additional surname of Aubrey on succeeding to the title in 1910. His eldest surviving son, Henry, the sixth Baronet, was Lord-Lieutenant of Buckinghamshire from 1954 to 1961. He was succeeded by his son, John, the seventh Baronet. He was High Sheriff of Buckinghamshire in 1961. As of 2008 the title is held by his son, Henry, the eighth Baronet, who succeeded in 1992. He is Lord-Lieutenant of Buckinghamshire since 2006.

Fletcher, Aubrey-Fletcher baronets, of Clea Hall & Ashley Park (1782)

Sir Henry Fletcher, 1st Baronet (1727–1807). He established the family seat at Ashley Park, Walton-on-Thames, Surrey. He was MP for Cumberland from 1768 to 1802.
Sir Henry Fletcher, 2nd Baronet (4 February 1772 – 10 August 1821). Fletcher was the son of Sir Henry Fletcher, 1st Baronet, and his wife Catherine Lintot. He married Frances Sophia Vaughan in 1801. They had at least one child. From 1810 to 1811 Fletcher served as High Sheriff of Cumberland. He died in August 1821, aged 49, and was succeeded in the baronetcy by his son, Henry. Lady Fletcher died in February 1828.
Sir Henry Fletcher, 3rd Baronet (18 September 1807 – 6 September 1851). Fletcher was the son of Sir Henry Fletcher, 2nd Baronet, and his wife Frances Sophia Vaughan. He was educated at New College, Oxford. Fletcher married Emily Maria Browne in 1834 and they had at least seven children: Eliza Emily Fletcher, died 1935; Sir Henry Aubrey-Fletcher, 4th Baronet; Lieutenant Edward Fletcher (1841–1881); Sir Lancelot Aubrey-Fletcher, 5th Baronet; Adelaide Maria Fletcher, 1848–1926; Reverend Philip Fletcher (1848–1928); John Lowther Fletcher (1851–1928). Fletcher died in September 1851, aged 43, and was succeeded in the baronetcy by his eldest son, Henry. Lady Fletcher died in January 1888.
Sir Henry Aubrey-Fletcher, 4th Baronet (1835–1910)
Sir Lancelot Aubrey-Fletcher, 5th Baronet (13 March 1846 – 5 January 1937). Fletcher was the second son of Sir Henry Fletcher, 3rd Baronet, and his wife Emily Maria Browne, and the younger brother of Sir Henry Aubrey-Fletcher, 4th Baronet, who died without issue in 1910. The same year he assumed by Royal licence the additional surname of Aubrey. Fletcher was married three times and had at least three children. He married firstly Gertrude Isabella Howell (d. 1878). They had one son (who lived between 1876 and 1882). After her death in 1878 he married secondly Emily Harriet Wade (d. 1911). They had at least two children: Kathleen Margaret Aubrey-Fletcher (1884–1959); Sir Henry Lancelot Aubrey-Fletcher, 6th Baronet After her death in 1911 he married thirdly Aileen Mary Macpherson. They had no children. In 1916 Aubrey-Fletcher donated part of his brother's estate in Angmering to the parish to be used as a recreation ground. The area is today known as Fletcher's Field. Aubrey-Fletcher died in January 1937 and was succeeded in the baronetcy by his son, Henry. Lady Aubrey-Fletcher died in June 1968.
Sir Henry Lancelot Aubrey-Fletcher, 6th Baronet (1887–1969)
Sir John Henry Lancelot Aubrey-Fletcher, 7th Baronet (22 August 1912 – 19 June 1992)
Sir Henry Egerton Aubrey-Fletcher, 8th Baronet (born 1945)

The heir apparent is the present holder's son John Robert Aubrey-Fletcher (born 1977), whose brother pulled HRH Prince William the Duke of Cambridge's ear while watching the Gold Cup at the Cheltenham Festival in March 2013. He has been a friend of Prince William since they both attended Ludgrove School in Berkshire.

Notes

References
Kidd, Charles, Williamson, David (editors). Debrett's Peerage and Baronetage (1990 edition). New York: St Martin's Press, 1990.

Baronetcies in the Baronetage of Great Britain
1782 establishments in Great Britain